Australia cricket team toured the United Arab Emirates (UAE) from 5 October to 3 November 2014 and played one Twenty20 International (T20I), three One Day Internationals (ODIs) and two Test matches against Pakistan. The series was played in the UAE owing to ongoing security concerns in Pakistan. The limited over matches were dominated by Australia while a rampant Pakistan whitewashed the Test series.

Squads

Tour matches

Warm-Up: Pakistan A vs Australians

T20I series

Only T20I

In Aaron Finch's debut match as captain Australia restricted Pakistan to an ordinary 96/9 on a slow turner with Glenn Maxwell (3/13 off 3 overs) and debutant Cameron Boyce (2/10 off 4 overs) being the chief wicket takers. Australia's reply got off to a shaky start, at one point 56/4 but David Warner (54*) steadied the innings, eventually comfortably winning the game by 6 wickets.

ODI series

1st ODI

Aaron Finch (0) was caught first ball after slicing a ball to Ahmed Shehzad at point. But David Warner (43) and Steve Smith (101) put on an 86 run partnership to steady the tourists. Australia ended up with 255/8 with Steve Smith scoring his maiden ODI century. Shahid Afridi (3/46) was the best bowler for Pakistan. In response, Australia bowled very well as Pakistan lost wickets at regular intervals with no batsmen scoring over 43. Mitchell Johnson (3/24) was the main wicket taker for Australia. In an unusual side note, Fawad Alam caused minor controversy mostly on social media when he bowled with his cap facing backwards.

2nd ODI

Pakistan made the perfect start to their innings with a steady 126 run opening partnership between Ahmed Shehzad (61) and Sarfraz Ahmed (65). But after both openers went in quick succession Pakistan collapsed to 215 (49.3 overs) with Mitchell Johnson continuing his form from the last match taking 3/40. In reply, Australia lost early wickets but steadied and reached the target with 40 balls remaining. Glenn Maxwell was their top run scorer with a quick knock of 76.

3rd ODI

Australia elected to rest Mitchell Johnson and Nathan Lyon. Steve Smith yet again starred with the bat with a patient 77 off 105 balls. David Warner (56) also chipped in to record his first half century of the series. Sohail Tanvir (3/40) was the main wicket taker for Pakistan. In reply, Pakistan seemed to have the match all but won when they needed 2 runs of the final over but Glenn Maxwell (2/41) completed a double wicket maiden earning him man of the match honors. Steve Smith's catch to dismiss Fawad Alam was controversial: Smith lined up at slip, and began moving towards the leg side after the ball was delivered but before it was hit, before taking the catch off Fawad's sweep shot at leg slip; the umpires had the discretion under the laws of the game to declare it a dead ball if they believed Smith's movement was unfair, but they decided it was fair and gave Fawad out, which some commentators disagreed with.

In addition to clean sweeping the series, Australia regained the number 1 ranking for ODIs.

Test series

1st Test

Pakistan won the toss and chose to bat in what was tipped to be a pitch that would gradually deteriorate. Mitchell Johnson and Peter Siddle removed the Pakistani openers, Mohammad Hafeez (0) and Ahmed Shehzad (3), in the first few overs. However, Pakistan steadied to end the day at 219/4 with Younus Khan hitting 106 off 223 balls. Mitchell Johnson did the bulk of the damage with an economical 3/22 off 20 overs on a slow and attritional day.

On the second day, Pakistan slowly began to accelerate with Sarfraz Ahmed (109) scoring his second century in Tests at over a-run-a-ball. Australia's reply began well with David Warner reaching his fifty. They ended the day at a solid 113/0.

Australia began their innings slowly on day three and struggled against Pakistan's inexperienced bowling attack, getting bowled out for 303, with debutant Yasir Shah (3/66) the pick of the bowlers while David Warner scored completed his century (133). The match was called off due to bad light at the end of the day with 2 overs remaining.

Australian debutant Stephen O'Keefe took the early wicket of Azhar Ali (30) early on day 4. But Pakistan dominated and eventually declared their innings at 286/2. Australia's second innings began well, but the spinners took quick wickets to leave Australia in trouble at 59/4 at the end of day 4.

Australia lost 3 wickets in the first session with Zulfiqar Babar doing most of the damage on day five. Australia managed to grind their way to the final session but succumbed to a 221 run defeat. He took his maiden five-wicket haul in the second Australian innings. Johnson (61) and Steve Smith (55) were Australia's top scorers. Khan's twin centuries in the match earned him the man of the match award.

2nd Test

Pakistan opted to have an unchanged team after they won the toss and decided to bat. Australia made two changes, with Alex Doolan replaced by Glenn Maxwell for his third test and Stephen O'Keefe replaced by Mitchell Starc. On another flat deck Pakistan made excellent progress with only two wickets, those of the openers Ahmed Shehzad (35) and Mohammad Hafeez (45), falling on day 1. At stumps, they were 304/2, with Younus Khan (111*) scoring his third consecutive century, and Azhar Ali (101*) was the other centurion. Mitchell Johnson (1/50) and Nathan Lyon (1/86) both took a wicket each. Due to bad light, play was suspended with 2 overs still to be bowled. Michael Clarke's unusual field positions, particularly placing Johnson at straight hit (behind the beginning of the bowler's run-up) were criticized by some commentators as not being in the "spirit of the game".

Within the first hour of the second day Australia finally struck with Starc taking the wicket of Azhar (109) caught by replacement wicket-keeper David Warner after Brad Haddin injured his right shoulder in a catching attempt. Pakistan continued to subdue the Australians finishing at 405/3 at lunch on an extended first session. Pakistan continued to pile on the runs in the second session with Younus reaching his double century and captain Misbah-ul-Haq (101) getting his century. Pakistan made accelerated in the third session, scoring some quick runs before declaring at a massive 570/6. Starc was the top wicket-taker with 2/86 (27 overs). Australia had to negotiate 5.2 overs before bad light stopped play, ending the day at 22/1.

Most of Australia's batsmen started well but they lost wickets at regular intervals on day 3 before finishing at a modest 261 all out just after tea. Mitchell Marsh top scored for Australia with 87. All of the Pakistani bowlers took wickets with Imran Khan (3/60) taking the most wickets. Pakistan led by 307 runs, but did not enforce the follow-on. Johnson removed the openers early in the innings and Pakistan finished at 61/2 before bad light once again stopped play.

Pakistan continued their dominance in the first session of day 4 scoring 149 runs with the loss of one wicket, that of Younus (46). Misbah smashed a 21 ball fifty that broke the record for the fastest fifty in Test cricket beating Jacques Kallis's 24 ball effort. After lunch, Maxwell took over the wicket-keeping role while Misbah (101*) equaled the fastest century in Tests with Sir Vivian Richards, coming from 56 deliveries. Azhar (100*) also completed his ton shortly after and Pakistan declared. Zulfiqar Babar took two Australian wickets before tea, those of Chris Rogers (2) and Maxwell (4). Pakistan took three more wickets before the close of play, with Steve Smith (38*) and Marsh (26*) still at the crease.

Smith and Marsh extended their partnership in the first session on day 5 until Marsh was caught at leg slip for 47. Smith continued to bat steadily as Australia reached 238/5 at lunch. But Smith was sent lbw by Yasir Shah for 97 second ball after lunch and Australia collapsed, losing their final five wickets just for eight runs. Pakistan won the series 2–0, their first series win against Australia since 1994. Zulfiqar was the best of the bowlers, taking his second five-wicket haul of the series (5/120 of 32.2 overs). Misbah was awarded the man of the match for his record-breaking century.

References

External links
Series home at ESPNcricinfo

2014 in Australian cricket
2014 in Pakistani cricket
2014-15
International cricket competitions in 2014–15
Australia 2014